Fomalhaut Nunatak is an isolated, flat-topped nunatak near the head of Ryder Glacier,  east of Mount Alpheratz of the Pegasus Mountains, in Palmer Land, Antarctica. It was named by the UK Antarctic Place-Names Committee after the star Fomalhaut in the constellation of Piscis Austrinus.

References 

Nunataks of Palmer Land